Chapter One ~Complete Collection~ is a greatest hit album from Beni Arashiro under label Avex Trax. This was her first and also her last greatest hit album she released as Beni Arashiro before she switched to label Universal Music Japan and stage name BENI. The last 3 tracks are new songs which were originally going to be released as a single. However the single was cancelled and listed on this album due to Benis label switch. Southern Star is a CM theme song for Orion Beer, BIG BANG is theme song for Mainichi Housou TV's broadcast of the Koushien Bowl theme song and Mellow Parade is a movie theme for the movie called Bra bra Ban ban which featured Beni herself. The DVD contains all her PVs and a First Live Digest.

Track listing
 Harmony
 Infinite...
 Here Alone
 Miracle 
 Give me Up
 Hikari no Kazu dake Glamorous (光の数だけグラマラス;As Glamorous as the number of Lights)
 THE POWER
 CALL ME, BEEP ME!
 Cherish
 GOAL
 FLASH FLASH (feat. KOHEI JAPAN)
 How Are U?
 Luna
 Southern Star
 Mellow Parade
 BIG BANG

DVD

 Harmony PV
 Infinite.. PV
 Here alone PV
 Miracle PV
 Hikari no kazu dake GLAMEROUS (光の数だけグラマラス;As Glamerous as the number of Lights)
 Cherish
 How Are U?
 Luna
■First LIVE digest 2007
 BAD GIRL
 光の数だけグラマラス
 Eternal flame
 Gems
 Luna
 Infinite...
 Here Alone
 How Are U ?
 Give Me Up

References

Beni (singer) albums
2008 compilation albums
2008 video albums
Music video compilation albums
2008 live albums
Live video albums